The term Bee Hive can refer to:

 Bee hive, an alternate spelling of the word beehive
 Bee Hive, Alabama, an unincorporated community 
 The Bee-Hive (journal), a 19th-century British newspaper
 Bee Hive Records, a jazz record  label
 Bee Hives, a 2004 album by Broken Social Scene of B-sides and rarities
 Bee Hive (peak), a mountain in Zion National Park, Utah, United States